Chief Donnacona (died  1539 in France) was the chief of the St. Lawrence Iroquois village of Stadacona, located at the present site of Quebec City, Quebec, Canada. French explorer Jacques Cartier, concluding his second voyage to what is now Canada, returned to France with Donnacona. Donnacona was treated well in France but he died there. Later Cartier would make a third voyage to the same area.

Cartier's first voyage

Jacques Cartier made three voyages to the land now called Canada, in 1536, 1538 and 1549. In late July 1534, in the course of his first voyage, he and his men encountered two hundred people fishing near Gaspé Bay. Cartier's men erected a "thirty foot long" cross which provoked a reaction from the leader of this fishing party. After some presentation of gifts to the people there, he left the area the next day, with two men on board, Domagaya and Taignoagny, from the fishing party. He returned to France with them, concluding his first voyage in September 1534. Some sources say that these men were the sons of Donnacona and the fishing party's leader was Donnacona himself, although the original 16th-century report does not mention this.

Cartier's second voyage

Jacques Cartier's second voyage began 19 May 1535 with Domagaya and Taignoagny as guides. They showed Cartier the entrance to the St. Lawrence River, and piloted him upriver to L'Isle-aux-Coudres and on to Donnacona's capital, Stadacona. (Cartier gives Donnacona's title as Agohanna, an Iroquoian word for chief.) Also as part of this voyage, Cartier went further up the St. Lawrence to Hochelega, present-day Montreal, on 2 October 1535, without Domagaya and Taignoagny, who were stopped by the chief from going with him.

As recorded in Cartier's journal, the French wintered in Canada. Relations between the St. Lawrence Iroquoian and French deteriorated over the winter. During the winter, twenty-five French sailors died of scurvy. In spring, Cartier intended to take the chief to France, so that he might personally tell the tale of a country further north, called the "Kingdom of Saguenay", said to be full of gold, rubies and other treasures. In May 1536, he kidnapped Chief Donnacona. It was an arduous trip down the St. Lawrence and a three-week Atlantic crossing. Donnacona and nine others from the tribe, including Domagaya and Taignoagny, arrived in Saint-Malo, France on 15 July 1536, concluding Cartier's second voyage.

Donnacona was treated well in France, and looked after at the king's expense. Cartier promised to bring Donnacona back in 12 moons. Donnacona died in France around 1539. The presence of these First Nations visitors whetted the French appetite for New World exploration with their tales of a golden kingdom called "Saguenay". All but one of the other Iroquoians died, a little girl whose fate is unknown.

Cartier returned to the new land in May 1541, on his third voyage, without any of those whom he had brought to France. That voyage lasted until his return in May 1542.

A report of Cartier's second voyage was printed in France in 1545, and is today in the British Museum. Excerpts given here are taken from Burrage, using Richard Hakluyt's English translation published in 1589–1600.

Legacy

Donnacona is remembered by a town, which now bears his name, on the north shore 30 mi (48 km) west of Quebec City, at the confluence of the Saint Lawrence and the Jacques-Cartier Rivers.

In 1981, Donnacona was recognized as a National Historic Person by the government of Canada. A plaque commemorating this is located at the Cartier-Brébeuf National Historic Site, 175 De L'Espinay St, Québec, Quebec.

HMCS Donnacona, a stone frigate, is located in Montreal, QC.

References

Further reading
 

Indigenous leaders in Quebec
New France
Iroquois people
Persons of National Historic Significance (Canada)
Indigenous leaders of the Americas
16th-century Native Americans
Pre-Confederation Quebec people
1530s deaths
1679